Psilogramma nebulosa is a moth of the  family Sphingidae. It is known from Queensland.

References

Psilogramma
Moths described in 1876
Endemic fauna of Australia